= 1977 National Rugby Championships =

Tournament details
- Tournament format(s): Various
- Date: 1977

Tournament statistics

Final

The 1977 National Rugby Championships featured USARFU's first installment of the Interterritorial championships while the Monterey National was in its 19th edition.

== ITT ==
Program cover for 1977 Interterritorial tournament.

The National Selection Tournament involved the four regional rugby unions comprising the United States RFU: Pacific Coast RFU, Western RFU, Midwest RFU, and the Eastern Rugby Union. The region teams are formed from selected players from the sub regional rugby unions. Subsequently, the USA Eagles are selected from the four regional teams after the ITT concludes. The selection committee was chaired by Keith Seaber representing the Midwest and also included Ray Cornbill of the East, Kevin Kitto from the West and Denis Storer for the Pacific Coast. The 1977 tournament was the inaugural edition and was played as a round robin from May 14–15 at Jackson Field in Greeley, CO. The Pacific Coast RFU were the champions and claimed the Governor's Cup. Tom Beckman of the Midwest was named the MVP.
Results:

14 May 1977
9:00AM

Western	6–10	Eastern
Try: Keith Wilkinson c Con: Doug Parks		Try: Clay Mahaffey; Otis Purvis; Con: Boyd Morrison

Greeley, CO
Referee: Dennis Shanagher (San Francisco)

14 May 1977
11:00AM

Pacific Coast	19–16	Midwest
Try: Dennis Jablonski; Bric Haley; Don Guest; Con: Dennis Jablonski (2); Pen: Dennis Jablonski		Try: Tim Swift (3); Scott Kelso

Greeley, CO
Referee: Jim Russel (Denver)

14 May 1977
2:30PM

Eastern	9–13	Pacific Coast
Pen: Dick Cooke (3)		Try: Don Guest; Pen: Kip Oxman (3)

Greeley, CO
Referee: Ed Green (Chicago)

14 May 1977
4:30PM

Western	0–16	Midwest
		Try: Tom Beckmann; Steve Chapman; Tim Swift; Con: Mike Halliday (2)

Greeley, CO
Referee: Alan Kitchener (Lancaster)

15 May 1977
10:00AM

Eastern	26–3	Midwest
Try: Rob Bordley (3); Con: Dick Cooke; Pen: Dick Cooke (4)		Pen: Jim Perkins

Greeley, CO
Referee: Dennis Shanagher (San Francisco)

15 May 1977
11:30AM

Western	12–23	Pacific Coast
Try: Greg Welfare c Con: Doug Parks; Pen: Doug Parks (2)		Try: David Stephenson; David Bateman; David Stephenson c David Stephenson c Con: Dennis Jablonski (2/4); Pen: Dennis Jablonski

Greeley, CO
Referee: Alan Kitchener (Lancaster)

Team		W	L	F	A
1	Pacific Coast Grizzlies	3	0	55	37
2	Eastern Colonials	2	1	45	22
3	Midwest Thunderbirds	1	2	35	45
4	Western Mustangs	0	3	18	49

U.S. Eagles selection:
Jay Hanson (Pacific), Bruce Henderson (West), Mike Sherlock (East), Craig Sweeney captain(Pacific), Bob Casey (East), Tom Klein (Pacific), Jeff Lambard (Pacific), Tom Selfridge (East), Scott Kelso (Midwest), Rob Bordley (East), David Stephenson (Pacific), Dan Wack (East), Don Guest (Pacific), Mike Liscovitz (East), Dennis Jablonski (Pacific).
Alternates: Carl Muhler (Pacific), Brad Andrews (Pacific), Steve Grey (Pacific), Dick Cook (East), Boyd Morrison (East), Bill Brown (West).

== Monterey National Championships ==
Program cover for 1977 tournament.

The 1977 Monterey National Rugby Championship was the 19th edition of the tournament and was considered to be the de facto national championship. This event took place at Pebble Beach, CA from March 19–20. The tournament MVPs were Terry Scott (UCLA) and Ann Fowler (UCLA), Bill Armstrong of the Old Blues won the Running Drop Kick contest while Kurt Huckaby of Chico was runner-up. Rudy Scholz of the Bald Eagles side from San Francisco and former Olympic gold medalist in 1920 and 1924 won the Oldest Player award at the age of 82. Mr. Watson Luke won a special award for having attended all the previous tournaments the sponsors named the perpetual trophy after him. The Santa Monica Rugby Club went 5–0 to take first place.

First round

19 March 1977 1	BATS	12-0	USC	Pebble Beach
7:00AM				Stadium: Field 1

19 March 1977 2	OMBAC	9-0	St. Mary's College	Pebble Beach
7:00AM				Stadium: Field 2

19 March 1977 3	San Jose State	6-0	Norwich RC	Pebble Beach
7:00AM				Stadium: Field 3

19 March 1977 4	Portland Pigs	9-9 (L–W p)	UC Davis	Pebble Beach
7:00AM				Stadium: Field 4

19 March 1977 5	X–O RC	9-0	Coronado RC	Pebble Beach
7:30AM				Stadium: Field 1

19 March 1977 6	Stanford University	4-0	Davis City RC	Pebble Beach
7:30AM				Stadium: Field 2

19 March 1977 7	Palo Alto RC	0-3	Hawaii Harlequins	Pebble Beach
7:30AM				Stadium: Field 3

19 March 1977 8	UCLA	9-0	U. of Oregon	Pebble Beach
7:30AM				Stadium: Field 4

19 March 1977 9	Old Puget Sound Beach	8-0	Sea Hawks	Pebble Beach
8:00AM				Stadium: Field 1

19 March 1977 10	San Francisco RC	3-0	Bakersfield Area RC	Pebble Beach
8:00AM				Stadium: Field 2

19 March 1977 11	Los Angeles RC	3-0	Hastings RFC	Pebble Beach
8:00AM				Stadium: Field 3

19 March 1977 12	UC Berkeley	18-0	U. of Washington	Pebble Beach
8:00AM				Stadium: Field 4

19 March 1977 13	Old Blues	12-0	Monterey RC	Pebble Beach
8:30AM				Stadium: Field 1

19 March 1977 14	Capitol RFC	6-10	Newport Beach RC	Pebble Beach
8:30AM				Stadium: Field 2

19 March 1977 15	Chuckanut Bay RC	0-0 (W–L p)	Olde Gaels	Pebble Beach
8:30AM				Stadium: Field 3

19 March 1977 16	Santa Monica RC	3-0	Chico State	Pebble Beach
8:30AM				Stadium: Field 4

Championship Bracket

Second Round; March 19
1	BATS	22
16	OMBAC	0
9	San Jose State	9
25	UC Davis	4
6	X.O. Rugby Club	3
11	Stanford	6
19	Hawaii Harlequins	6
3	UCLA	9
4	Old Puget Sound	9
13	San Francisco	3
12	Los Angeles	4
5	Berkeley	12
7	Old Blues	7
10	Newport Beach	6
15	Chuckanut Bay	0
2	Santa Monica	10

Quarterfinals; March 19
1	BATS	25
9	San Jose State	0
11	Stanford	12
3	UCLA	25
4	Old Puget Sound	0
5	Berkeley	7
7	Old Blues	3
2	Santa Monica	4

Semifinals; March 19
1	BATS	6
3	UCLA	10
5	Berkeley	0
2	Santa Monica	9

Final; March 20
3	UCLA	0
2	Santa Monica	14
Third place
1	BATS	15
5	Berkeley	6

=== Final ===
20 March 1977
2:20PM

UCLA	0–14	Santa Monica
		Try: Bryan Kelly; Greg Schneeweis 65' c Craig Sweeney; Con: Rich Havard

Pebble Beach, CA
Attendance: 6,500

Champions: Santa Monica Rugby Club
Coach: Ron Nisbet
Captain: Craig Sweeney
Roster: Brad Andrews, Steve Auerbach, Dave Briley, Tim Desmond, Ron Guss, Richard Harvard, Jerry Kelleher, Brian Kelley, Vic Leopisto, Dennis Murphy, Greg Schneeweis, Jeff Smith, David Stephenson, Jeff Todd.

5th–8th
L33	San Jose State	4
L34	Stanford	4*
L35	Old Puget Sound	0
L36	Old Blues	31

Fifth place
W51	Stanford	3
W52	Old Blues	17
Seventh place
L51	San Jose State	3
L52	Old Puget Sound	19

* Advanced on kicks

Thirteenth
Field 2 9:40AM
W55	UC Davis	3
W56	Los Angeles	15
Fifteenth
Field 4 12:00PM
L55	Hawaii Harlequins	0*
L56	Chuckanut Bay	0

13th–16th
Field 2 3:00PM
L37	UC Davis	9
L38	Hawaii Harlequins	0
Field 4 3:40PM
L39	Los Angeles	13
L40	Chuckanut Bay	6

9th–16th
Field 2 12:10PM
L17	OMBAC	13
L18	UC Davis	3
Field 2 12:50PM
L19	X.O. RC	11
L20	Hawaii Harlequins	6
Field 3 1:20PM
L21	San Francisco	4
L22	Los Angeles	0
Field 4 1:00PM
L23	Newport Beach	15
L24	Chuckanut Bay	3

9th–12th
Field 2 3:40PM
W37	OMBAC	8
W38	X.O. RC	3
Field 3 3:50PM
W39	San Francisco	3
W40	Newport Beach	6

Ninth
Field 2 10:50AM
W53	OMBAC	7
W54	Newport Beach	13
Eleventh
Field 3 12:00PM
L53	X.O.	16
L54	San Francisco	9

* Won on kicks

Consolation Bracket

Second Round; March 19
L1	USC	0
L2	St. Mary's	3
L3	Norwich	14
L4	Portland	18
L5	Coronado	6
L6	Davis City	3
L7	Palo Alto	7
L8	U. of Oregon	4
L9	Sea Hawks	0
L10	Bakersfield Area	21
L11	Hastings	6
L12	U. of Washington	10
L13	Monterey	0
L14	Capitol	13
L15	Olde Gaels	0
L16	Chico State	3

Quarterfinals; March 19
W25	St. Mary's	0
W26	Portland	8
W27	Coronado	0
W28	Palo Alto	13
W29	Bakersfield Area	6
W30	U. of Washington	0
W31	Capitol	6
W32	Chico State	3

Semifinals; March 19
W41	Portland	6
W42	Palo Alto	3
W43	Bakersfield Area	0
W44	Capitol	6

17th place March 20
W57	Portland	12
W58	Capitol	12*
19th place
L57	Palo Alto	8
L58	Bakersfield Area	37

* Won on kicks

21st–24th
L41	St. Mary's	0
L42	Coronado	3
L43	U. of Washington	0
L44	Chico State	12

21st place
W59	Coronado	29
W60	Chico State	6
23rd place
L59	St. Mary's	16
L60	U. of Washington	15

29th place
Field 3 8:30AM
W63	U. of Oregon	12
W64	Monterey	10
31st place
Field 4 8:30AM
L63	Norwich	6
L64	Sea Hawks	51

29th–32nd
Field 4 3:00PM
L45	Norwich	3
L46	U. of Oregon	12
Field 3 5:10PM
L47	Sea Hawks	0
L48	Monterey	3

25th–32nd
Field 4 11:40AM
L25	USC	20
L26	Norwich	0
Field 4 12:20PM
L27	Davis City	6
L28	U. of Oregon	3
Field 4 2:20PM
L29	Sea Hawks	0
L30	Hastings	4
Field 4 1:40PM
L31	Monterey	3
L32	Olde Gaels	7

25th–28th
Field 4 4:20PM
W45	USC	12
W46	Davis City	0
Field 4 5:00PM
W47	Hastings	0
W48	Olde Gaels	4

25th place
Field 1 8:30AM
W61	USC	8
W62	Olde Gaels	16
27th place
Field 2 8:30AM
L61	Davis City	17
L62	Hastings	7

Exhibition matches:

- B.C. Whoi Whoi 9-14 Bald Eagles
- UCLA Women's RC 8-0 San Francisco Women's RC
